In mathematics, discrete Chebyshev polynomials, or Gram polynomials, are a type of discrete orthogonal polynomials used in approximation theory, introduced by Pafnuty Chebyshev and rediscovered by Gram. They were later found to be applicable to various algebraic properties of spin angular momentum.

Elementary Definition

with  being the Dirac delta function. That is,

The integral on the left is actually a sum because of the delta function, and we have,

 are of any significance. Nevertheless, because these polynomials can be defined in terms of orthogonality with respect to a nonnegative weight function, the entire theory of orthogonal polynomials is applicable. In particular, the polynomials are complete in the sense that

Chebyshev chose the normalization so that

This fixes the polynomials completely along with the sign convention, .

Advanced Definition

The task is to approximate f as a polynomial of degree n < m. Consider a positive semi-definite bilinear form

be a discrete semi-norm. Let  be a family of polynomials orthogonal to each other

Assume all the polynomials  have a positive leading coefficient and they are normalized in such a way that

The  are called discrete Chebyshev (or Gram) polynomials.

Connection with Spin Algebra

The discrete Chebyshev polynomials have surprising connections to various algebraic properties of spin: spin transition probabilities,
the probabilities for observations of the spin in Bohm's spin-s version of the Einstein-Podolsky-Rosen experiment,
and Wigner functions for various spin states.

Specifically, the polynomials turn out to be the eigenvectors of the absolute square of the rotation matrix (the Wigner D-matrix). The associated eigenvalue is the Legendre polynomial , where  is the rotation angle. In other words, if

where  are the usual angular momentum or spin eigenstates,
and

then

The eigenvectors  are scaled and shifted versions of the Chebyshev polynomials. In addition, the  can be scaled so as to obey other normalization conditions. For example, one could demand that they satisfy

References

Orthogonal polynomials
Approximation theory